Indian Agent is a 1948 Western film starring Tim Holt as a cowboy trying to convince Indians not to go on the warpath due to the activities of a corrupt Indian agent.

Background
The film was finished in May 1948. It was released in December 1948 on a double bill with He Walked By Night.

Significance
The so-called A Westerns are often credited with the major break throughs in movie making culture. So we often overlook the significance of the so-called B Westerns. A good example. Any Western Movie fan knows that the July 1950 released A Western Broken Arrow (1950 film) pioneered early attempts to bring a more positive pro-aboriginal or pro-indigenous perspective to the USA's early peoples. However, with this earlier movie filmed in May 1948, Writer Norman Houston, Producer Herman Schlom, and the All-Time Movie Volume Western Movie Director Lesley Selander, advanced "the goal posts" even closer to that date in July 1950 with this December 1948 released B Western movie which portrayed the USA's earliest people in a more positive light.

References

External list
 
Review of film at Variety

1948 films
American Western (genre) films
1948 Western (genre) films
RKO Pictures films
American black-and-white films
Films directed by Lesley Selander
1940s American films